Admiral Richard Darton Thomas (3 June 1777 – 21 August 1857) was an officer of the British Royal Navy who served during the French Revolutionary and Napoleonic Wars, and went on to become Commander-in-Chief, Pacific Station in the 1840s.

Biography

Background and early naval service
Thomas was born in Saltash, Cornwall, and entered the Navy on 26 May 1790, just before his 13th birthday, as a captain's servant aboard the 74-gun ship , under the command of Captain John McBride, and late in the year sailed to the West Indies as part of a squadron under Rear-Admiral Samuel Pitchford Cornish. On arrival in the Caribbean he transferred to the 32-gun frigate  under the command of Captain Robert Murray, and was rated able. Blanche was paid off in June 1792, and in December he joined the sloop  as a midshipman.

Wartime service
On 1 January 1793 France declared war on Great Britain, and for the next two years Thomas served aboard Nautilus in the West Indies under the Captains Lord Henry Paulet, James Carpenter, Henry William Bayntun, and William Gordon Rutherford, while taking part in operations against the French islands of Tobago, Saint Lucia, and Martinique, where he commanded a boat in the attack on Fort Royal, landing and escalading the walls simultaneously with Captain Robert Faulknor of the sloop .

He was aboard her at Spithead on 1 May 1795 when a fire broke out aboard and the ship was destroyed. Thomas was forced to jump overboard, and swam to a nearby boat. From there he moved into , flagship of Sir John Jervis. He was subsequently sent on shore with a party of seamen to man the guns at the Fort of St. Fiorenza, in Corsica, remaining there until the island was evacuated in October 1796.

On 15 January 1797 Thomas was commissioned as a lieutenant aboard the 74-gun , commanded by Captain Cuthbert Collingwood, and took part in the Battle of Cape St Vincent on 14 February. In June 1798 he moved into the frigate Thalia, under Captain Lord Henry Paulet, rejoining him in the 74-gun  in February 1799 after three months on half-pay. In early June 1803 Thomas finally received notification of his promotion to commander of the fifth-rate , dated 18 January.

He sailed from Halifax as a passenger aboard the 179-ton Post Office packet Lady Hobart. Four days out she was intercepted by a French schooner, L' Aimable Julie, who mistook her for an unarmed merchant. After taking the French vessel as prize, Lady Hobart continued on her voyage, but during the night of 28 July struck a large iceberg, and foundered. All aboard her were crammed into the ship's cutter and jolly boat for a 350-mile voyage back to land, with only small amounts of ship's biscuit, water and rum as provisions. Despite encountering heavy rain, gales and thick fog, they made a landfall at Lower Island Cove on 4 June, all suffering from various degrees of malnutrition and frostbite. The only casualty was the French captain, who threw himself overboard in a fit of depression.

Thomas eventually returned to England and in December 1803 was appointed to command of the bomb vessel , to serve in the Mediterranean. His position was a particularly arduous one, there being no Captain of the Fleet, and Collingwood was for much of the time severely ill with the cancer that would eventually kill him in March 1810. After Collingwood's death Thomas served as captain of the Ville de Paris until December 1810. The following February he was appointed to command of the frigate  initially engaged on operations on the coast of Catalonia, then on the blockade of Marseilles and Toulon. He was eventually invalided home in February 1813, and saw no further wartime service.

Post-war career
Between April 1822 and April 1825, and again from May 1834, Thomas served as Superintendent of the Ships in Ordinary at Portsmouth and Plymouth, until promoted to rear-admiral on 10 January 1837. His duties were more diplomatic than military; settling the long-standing claims of the owners of the British brig Anna which had been seized in 1822, and of the British merchants who had been plundered at Callao, and obtaining compensation from El Salvador and Costa Rica for injuries and losses sustained by the British residents. He also had to deal with the occupation of Tahiti by the French Rear-Admiral Abel Aubert du Petit-Thouars, and the unauthorized annexation of the Sandwich Islands by one of his own subordinates. His conduct in office, particularly his handing of the Sandwich Islands crisis received the full approval of the Foreign Office and Admiralty, and King Kamehameha III ordered a portrait of Thomas in full uniform for his palace. He also received the thanks of the government of the United States and was appointed an honorary member of the American Board of Commissioners for Foreign Missions.

Thomas was promoted to vice-admiral on 8 January 1848, and to admiral on 11 September 1854. He died in Stonehouse, Devon on 21 August 1857.

Personal life
On 2 October 1827 Thomas married Gratiana, the third daughter of Lieutenant-General Robert Williams, Colonel-Commandant of the Royal Marines at Stonehouse, and had a son and daughter. His brother, Charles Thomas, M.D., was Physician to the Dispensary at Devonport. On 13 November 1850 his daughter Gratiana Mary Thomas (1831–1922) married Sir Mathew Wharton Wilson (1827–1909), son of Sir Mathew Wilson, 1st Baronet, one of the Wilson baronets.

See also

 Thomas Square, Honolulu

References

1777 births
1857 deaths
People from Saltash
Sailors from Cornwall
Royal Navy personnel of the French Revolutionary Wars
Royal Navy personnel of the Napoleonic Wars
Royal Navy admirals